Testudovolva nipponensis is a species of sea snail, a marine gastropod mollusk in the family Ovulidae, the ovulids, cowry allies or false cowries.

Description
The shell size varies between 5 mm and 14 mm. Color can vary, including white, fawn or pale purple with outer lip white.

Distribution
This species is distributed in the Pacific Ocean along Japan and the Philippines.  Can be found at low tide as well as among soft corals.

References

 Cate, C. N. 1973. A systematic revision of the recent Cypraeid family Ovulidae. Veliger 15 (supplement): 1–117
 Lorenz F. & Fehse D. (2009). The Living Ovulidae - A manual of the families of Allied Cowries: Ovulidae, Pediculariidae and Eocypraeidae. Conchbooks, Hackenheim, Germany

External links

Ovulidae
Gastropods described in 1913